Calamorhabdium is a small genus of snakes, commonly known as iridescent snakes, in the family Colubridae. The genus contains two described species. Both species are burrowing snakes found in Asia.

Species
Calamorhabdium acuticeps  – Sulawesi iridescent snake
Calamorhabdium kuekenthali  – Batjan iridescent snake

Etymology
The specific name, kuekenthali, is in honor of German zoologist Willy Kükenthal.

References

Further reading
Boettger O (1898). Katalog der Reptilien-Sammlung im Museum der Senckenbergischen Naturforschenden Gessellschaft in Frankfurt am Main. II. Teil (Schlangen). Frankfurt am Main: Gebrüder Knauer. ix + 160 pp. (Calamorhabdium, new genus, p. 82; C. kuekenthali, new species, p. 82). (in German).

Colubrids
Reptiles of Southeast Asia
Snake genera
Taxa named by Oskar Boettger